Under the Stars is a 2007 Spanish comedy-drama film directed and written by  based on the novel by Fernando Aramburu which stars Alberto San Juan alongside Emma Suárez, Julián Villagrán, and Violeta Rodríguez.

Plot 
The plot follows freeloading trumpeter Benito Lacunza upon his return from Madrid to his Navarrese hometown (Estella-Lizarra) in the wake of his father's impending death, and his relation with brother Lalo, Lalo's partner Nines, and Nines' withdrawn daughter Ainara.

Cast

Production 
The film is based on the novel El trompetista del Utopía by Fernando Aramburu. A Fernando Trueba PC production, it had the participation of TVE and Canal+. Shooting locations included Estella-Lizarra.

Release 
The film was presented at the 10th Málaga Film Festival in March 2007. It was released theatrically in Spain on 15 June 2007.

Reception 
Jonathan Holland of Variety considered that the film features "an ace performance from Alberto San Juan, who makes the movie his own by simply flooding it with humanity".

Javier Ocaña of El País deemed the film to be a "a comedy with dramatic overtones endowed with an unusual visual poetry".

Accolades 

|-
| rowspan = "4" align = "center" | 2007 || rowspan = "4" | 10th Málaga Film Festival || colspan = "2" | Golden Biznaga ||  || rowspan = "4" align = "center" | 
|-
| Best Director || Félix Viscarret || 
|-
| Best Actor || Alberto San Juan || 
|-
| Best New Screenplay || Félix Viscarret || 
|-
| rowspan = "9" align = "center" | 2008 || rowspan = "7" | 22nd Goya Awards || Best Adapted Screenplay || Félix Viscarret ||  || rowspan = "7" | 
|-
| Best New Director || Félix Viscarret || 
|-
| Best Actor || Alberto San Juan || 
|-
| Best Actress || Emma Suárez || 
|-
| Best Supporting Actor || Julián Villagrán || 
|-
| Best Original Score || Mikel Salas || 
|-
| Best Cinematography || Álvaro Gutiérrez || 
|-
| rowspan = "2" | 17th Actors and Actresses Union Awards || Best Film Actor in a Leading Role || Alberto San Juan ||  || rowspan = "2" | 
|-
| Best New Actor || Julián Villagrán ||  
|}

See also 
 List of Spanish films of 2007

References

External links 
 

2007 comedy-drama films
Spanish comedy-drama films
2000s Spanish films
2000s Spanish-language films
Films set in Navarre
Films shot in Navarre
Films based on Spanish novels